Christopher K. W. Tam is an American mathematician, currently the Robert O. Lawton Distinguished Professor at Florida State University.

References

Year of birth missing (living people)
Living people
Florida State University faculty
California Institute of Technology alumni
Mathematicians from Florida